Caldecott is a suburb of Abingdon in Oxfordshire, England.
Caldecott was formerly part of Sutton Wick but is now part of Abingdon.

Villages in Oxfordshire